The Marshall County Courthouse in Britton, in the state of South Dakota in the Midwestern United States, was built in 1908. It was listed on the National Register of Historic Places in 2006.

It is a three-and-a-half-story building.  It replaced use of the former Arlington Hotel as county courthouse, and solidified the selection of Britton as the county seat of Marshall County.

References

Courthouses on the National Register of Historic Places in South Dakota
Renaissance Revival architecture in South Dakota
Government buildings completed in 1908
Buildings and structures in Marshall County, South Dakota
County courthouses in South Dakota
National Register of Historic Places in Marshall County, South Dakota
1908 establishments in South Dakota